Tussey Mountain Junior/Senior High School is a comprehensive high school, located in extreme northeastern Bedford County, Pennsylvania serving around 525 students in grades 7–12.

Graduation requirements
A student wishing to graduate from Tussey Mountain  must obtain 25 credits, complete a Graduation Project, as well as score profiecent or above on the Pennsylvania System of State Assessments.

Course breakdown
 English - 4.0 Credits
 Science - 3.0 Credits
 Social Studies - 3.0 Credits
 Mathematics - 3.0 Credits
 Arts, Humanities, or Arts & Humanities - 2.0 Credits
 Physical Education - 1.5 Credits
 Health - 0.5 Credit
 Electives - 6.5 Credits
 Applied Life Skills - 0.5 Credit
 1.0 Credit in an Academic or Vocational Area

Courses of study
There are several courses of study available to the TMHS student, as follows:
 Business Vocational
 Production Industries
 Home Economics Occupations
 Building Construction Occupations
 Electronics
 Academic - Business Emphasis
 Academic - Math/Science Emphasis
 Academic - Arts/Communications Emphasis

Athletics
 Baseball – Class A
 Basketball – Class AA
 Football – Class A
 Golf – Class A
 Softball – Class A
 Boys Tennis – Class AA
 Track and Field – Class AA
 Volleyball – Class A
 Wrestling – Class AA

References

Schools in Bedford County, Pennsylvania
Public high schools in Pennsylvania
Public middle schools in Pennsylvania